In the Ukrainian language there are three major dialectal groups according to territory: ,  and  of dialects.

List of dialects

Southwestern group

Southeastern group

Northern group

Emigre dialects 
Ukrainian is also spoken by a large émigré population, particularly in Canada (Canadian Ukrainian), The United States, Brazil, Argentina, and Australia. The founders of this population primarily emigrated from Galicia, which used to be part of Austro-Hungary before World War I, and belonged to Poland between the World Wars. The language spoken by most of them is based on the Galician dialect of Ukrainian from the first half of the twentieth century. Compared with modern Ukrainian, the vocabulary of Ukrainians outside Ukraine reflects less influence of Russian, yet may contain Polish or German loanwords. It often contains many loanwords from the local language as well (e.g. , for "sneakers" in the United States).

Disputed status of some dialects

Balachka 

Balachka is spoken in the Kuban region of Russia, by the Kuban Cossacks. The Kuban Cossacks being descendants of the Zaporozhian Cossacks are beginning to consider themselves as a separate ethnic identity. Their dialect is based on Middle Dnieprian with the Ukrainian grammar. It includes dialectical words of central Ukrainian with frequent inclusion of Russian vocabulary, in particular for modern concepts and items. It varies somewhat from one area to another.

Rusyn 

The Rusyn language is classified as a dialect of Ukrainian by the Ukrainian government. However Rusyn is considered by some linguists to be a separate language.
 Dolinian Rusyn or Subcarpathian Rusyn is spoken in the Transcarpathian Oblast.
 Pannonian or Bačka Rusyn is spoken in northwestern Serbia and eastern Croatia. Rusin language of the Bačka dialect has been recognised as one of the official languages of the Serbian Autonomous Province of Vojvodina).
 Pryashiv Rusyn is the Ukrainian dialect spoken in the Prešov (in Ukrainian: Pryashiv) region of Slovakia, as well as by some émigré communities, primarily in the United States of America.

See also 
Balachka
Boiko
Poleszuk
Rusyn language
Ruthenian (disambiguation)

References

Sources 
 Del Gaudio S. 2017. An introduction to Ukrainian Dialectology. Wiener Slawistischer Almanach, Sonderband 94. Frankfurt am Main etc. Peter Lang.
 Dialects of Ukrainian language
 Luckyj, George S.N. ([1956] 1990). Literary Politics in the Soviet Ukraine, 1917–1934, revised and updated edition, Durham and London: Duke University Press. .
 . Ukrainian translation is partially available online.
 , (in Ukrainian). Available online.
 
 Василь Німчук. Періодизація як напрямок дослідження генези та історії української мови. Мовознавство. 1997.- Ч.6.-С.3-14; 1998.
 Микола Лесюк "Різнотрактування історії української мови".
 
 "What language is spoken in Ukraine", in Welcome to Ukraine, 2003, 1.
 All-Ukrainian population census 2001
 Конституція України (Constitution of Ukraine) (in Ukrainian), 1996, English translation (excerpts).
 1897 census
 Literaturnyy Forum (Ukrainian language)
 Ukrainian–English Dictionary
 Radio Canada International daily Ukrainian language news broadcasts and transcripts
 Ukrainian Linguistic Portal
 Dialects of Ukrainian language
 Ukrainian language – the third official? – Ukrayinska Pravda, 28 November 2005

External links
Короткий словник львівської ґвари Upper Dniestrian

 
Dialects
Languages of Azerbaijan
Languages of Belarus
Languages of Kazakhstan
Languages of Hungary
Languages of Russia
Languages of Ukraine
Languages of Slovakia
Languages of Poland
Dialects by language